The Anzahamaru skink (Paracontias hildebrandti) is a species of skinks. It is endemic to Madagascar.

References

Paracontias
Reptiles described in 1877
Reptiles of Madagascar
Taxa named by Albert Günther